Klara Zamenhof (6 October 18636 December 1924) was a Polish Esperantist. She was married to L. L. Zamenhof, the inventor of the Esperanto language.

Biography
She was born on 6 October 1863 in Kaunas, Lithuania, then part of the Russian Empire as Kovno. She was the oldest daughter of Alexander Sender Silbernik and Golda Silbernik, wealthy Jewish merchants from Kovno.

Contributions to Esperanto
After her husband's premature death on 14 April 1917, she took over the promotion of Esperanto. She continued the development of the community centred around the language and supported her daughter Lidia, who trained as an Esperanto teacher in Europe and the US.

Personal life
She married Ludwik Lejzer Zamenhof in 1887, and raised three children: Adam, Lidia, and Zofia. All three were murdered in the Holocaust.

She died in Warsaw on 6 December 1924, and is buried in the Jewish Cemetery there.

References

External links
Obituary of Klara Zamenhof. In Esperanto.

1863 births
1924 deaths
Esperanto speaking Jews
Lithuanian Esperantists
Lithuanian Jews
People from Kaunas
Polish Esperantists
Russian Esperantists